Alphonse Albert Lacroix (October 21, 1897 – April 12, 1973), known as "Al" or "Frenchy", was an American ice hockey goaltender who is best known as a member of the silver medal-winning American ice hockey team at the 1924 Winter Olympics, and as the emergency goaltender who replaced Georges Vezina when he collapsed in a game in 1925.

Career
Lacroix was born in Newton, Massachusetts, and began his hockey career playing for the high school team in 1914. By 1917 he began playing in the Boston city senior amateur league. He joined the Boston Athletic Association in 1919 and played for their hockey team in the city senior league and later the United States Amateur Hockey Association. He was selected to the United States Olympic team at the 1924 Winter Olympics, winning a silver medal.

In 1925 he was retained by the National Hockey League as an emergency goaltender, on hand to replace any of the clubs' goalies should they suffer serious injury. His only experience at the top professional level came in 1925, when he replaced the Montreal Canadiens' Georges Vezina.

Vézina was unknowingly suffering from tuberculosis. Running a fever of 102 °F and coughing up blood on the ice, Lacroix relieved Vézina at the start of the second period of the opening game of the 1925–26 Montreal Canadiens season against the Pittsburgh Pirates on November 28. By December 15 the Canadiens had signed Herb Rheaume as Vézina's permanent replacement. Lacroix would stay on with the Canadiens as a spare goaltender until 1927, but never played another game in the NHL.

Lacroix continued his career in the Can-Am League and the semi-pro North East Hockey League. He retired from hockey in 1931.

He died in Lewiston, Maine.

Career statistics

Regular season and playoffs

International

References

External links
 

1897 births
1973 deaths
American men's ice hockey goaltenders
Boston Athletic Association ice hockey players
Boston Tigers players
Ice hockey players from Massachusetts
Ice hockey players at the 1924 Winter Olympics
Medalists at the 1924 Winter Olympics
Montreal Canadiens players
Olympic silver medalists for the United States in ice hockey
Providence Reds players
Sportspeople from Newton, Massachusetts